Majlis special commission for examining the JCPOA is the select committee of 15 Iran's Islamic Consultative Assembly (Majlis) representatives to review the Joint Comprehensive Plan of Action.

Membership 
On 19 August 2015, 24 Majlis representatives became nominated for the commission membership and after an anonymous voting, top 15 determined by 225 votes became members. Members of the commission sorted by number of votes are as follows:

See also 
 Iran Nuclear Achievements Protection Act

References 

Iranian legislators
2015 in Iran
Presidency of Hassan Rouhani
Nuclear program of Iran